Emmanuel "Manny" Rugamba (born March 10, 1998) is a Rwandan-American professional gridiron football defensive back for the BC Lions of the Canadian Football League (CFL). He played college football at Miami (OH) and was signed as an undrafted free agent by the Browns after the 2021 NFL Draft, becoming the first Rwandan to be signed to an NFL team.

College career
Rugamba was ranked as a threestar recruit by 247Sports.com coming out of high school. He committed to Iowa on August 1, 2015 and converted from wide receiver to cornerback. After two seasons at Iowa, Rugamba decided to transfer from Iowa on May 13, 2018. He committed to Miami (OH) shortly thereafter.

Professional career

Cleveland Browns
Rugamba was signed as an undrafted free agent by the Cleveland Browns on May 3, 2021. He was waived by the Browns on August 31, 2021.

BC Lions
On February 17, 2022, it was announced that Rugamba had signed with the BC Lions. He began the season on the practice roster, but made his regular season debut on August 13, 2022, against the Calgary Stampeders where he had two defensive tackles.

References

1998 births
Living people
American football cornerbacks
BC Lions players
Canadian football defensive backs
Cleveland Browns players
Iowa Hawkeyes football players
Miami RedHawks football players
Zambian players of American football